Castle View High School is a public high school in Castle Rock, Colorado. It is part of the Douglas County School District. It opened in August 2006.

References 

Public high schools in Colorado
Schools in Douglas County, Colorado
Educational institutions established in 2006
2006 establishments in Colorado